Henry John Williams (8 February 1838 – 1 April 1919) was an English Anglican priest and activist for humanitarianism, animal rights and vegetarianism. He was the founder of the Order of the Golden Age; an international animal rights society.

Biography 
Henry John Williams was born on 8 February 1838 in Whatley, Mendip. He was the son of Margaret Sophia and Hamilton John Williams, an Anglican priest. Williams had six brothers, including Howard Williams the author of The Ethics of Diet and a vegetarian and fellow humanitarian.

At the age of 40, Williams was inspired by his brother to become a vegetarian. He later published the pamphlet A Plea for a Broken Law, which made a case for vegetarianism from a theological point of view. He founded an animal rights society, the Order of the Golden Age in 1881, it was constituted in 1882. Due to a lack of funds, the organisation was inactive until 1895, when Williams, Sidney H. Beard and others met and discussed how to remedy its dormancy. Williams wrote for the order's journal, The Herald of the Golden Age.

Williams was rector of Kinross, honorary president of the Scottish Vegetarian Society and a member of the Humanitarian League's Humane Diet department.

Williams died on 1 April 1919 in Aspley Guise, at the age of 81; his brother published an obituary in the May 1919 edition of The Vegetarian Messenger and Health Review.

Selected publications 
 A Plea for a Broken Law

References 

1838 births
1919 deaths
19th-century English Anglican priests
20th-century English Anglican priests
British vegetarianism activists
Christian vegetarianism
English animal rights activists
English humanitarians
English pamphleteers
Organization founders
People associated with the Order of the Golden Age
People from Mendip District